Holubec (feminine Holubcová) is a Czech surname. Notable people include:

 Aleš Holubec, Czech volleyball player
 Jiří Holubec, Czech biathlete
 Kateřina Holubcová, Czech biathlete
 Mikuláš Holubec or Nicolaus de Holubicz († round 1359)), canon, second director of construction of the cathedral in Prague 
 Tomáš Holubec, Czech biathlete

See also
 
 Holub, Holoubek - Czech surnames with similar linguistic origin
 Gołąb, Golomb, Golumbic

Czech-language surnames